Ernest Bertram Lloyd  (14 May 1881 – 9 June 1944) was an English naturalist, humanitarian, vegetarian and campaigner for animal rights. He was the founder of the National Society for the Abolition of Cruel Sports.

Biography 
Lloyd was born in North London on 14 May 1881. He was a member of the Lloyd banking family. and educated privately at Merchant Taylors' School. He then spent two years in Germany, where he attained fluency in German. On his return to London, Lloyd worked for his family's business for a number of years, but his passions ultimately lay elsewhere.

Lloyd was a member of Henry S. Salt's original Humanitarian League and a conscientious objector during the First World War. In 1918, he published his first edited collection of anti-war poems Poems Written During the Great War, 1914–1918, the selected poems critiqued the idealization and glamour of war. In 1919, he published a further anti-war poetry collection The Paths of Glory.

From 1920, he contributed to the ornithology magazine, British Birds. In 1921, Lloyd published The Great Kinship, an anthology of humanitarian poetry. In 1932, he founded the National Society for the Abolition of Cruel Sports, where he worked as Honorary Secretary for the remainder of his life. From 1935, he was editor of the journal Transactions of the Hertfordshire Natural History Society. He was also a member of the British Ornithologists' Union and Fellow of the Linnean Society of London.

In 1938, he married Sylvia Colenso in Cardigan, Wales.

Lloyd suffered from poor health near the end of his life; he became a Fellow of the Royal Entomological Society two days before his death at Champneys, near Tring, on 9 June 1944, aged 63. He composed his own epitaph, which ended "He cared not a farthing for Heaven or God, / But valued far more an inch of green sod."

Selected publications 

 (ed.) 
(ed.) 
 (ed.) 
(ed.)

References

Further reading 

 

1881 births
1944 deaths
20th-century naturalists
20th-century British zoologists
British vegetarianism activists
Birdwatchers
English animal rights activists
English anti-war activists
English conscientious objectors
English entomologists
English humanitarians
English naturalists
English ornithologists
English pacifists
English people of Welsh descent
English socialists
Fellows of the Linnean Society of London
Fellows of the Royal Entomological Society
Lloyd family of Birmingham
Members of British Ornithologists' Union
People educated at Merchant Taylors' School, Northwood